Helen Lake is a  lake located on Vancouver Island north of the head of Taylor Arm, Sproat Lake.

References

Alberni Valley
Lakes of Vancouver Island
Clayoquot Land District